Khan Muhammad Khan (Urdu: خان محمد خان) ( – June 1995) commonly known as Khan of Mong, was a Captain in the British Indian Army during the World War II. After demobilisation, he served as a rebel leader during the First Kashmir War. He is credited with the capture of Mirpur, even though the real action was carried out by Pakistan's PAVO Cavalry. He was also allegedly involved with the Rawalpindi Conspiracy and the Poonch Uprising.

Biography
Khan Muhammad Khan was born in April, 1919 in Mong to Alam Sher Khan, a local dignitary. He joined the British Indian Army and received his commission in 1938. He was with Fusiliers for 18 months and served as a King's Commissioned Indian Officer for 2 years. He participated in World War II and was posted to 3rd Battalion of 1st Punjab Regiment in the Middle East and Italy.

Khan took part in the First Kashmir War as a rebel leader. He was active in the Mirpur sector. He led the Mirpur campaign and later raised the 24 Azad Kashmir Battalion (Khan) of the Azad Kashmir Regiment.

According to his personal memoirs, during the 1955 Poonch uprising against the state of Azad Jammu and Kashmir, Khan of Mong was involved in the rallying of support for the movement. He fled to Indian-administered Kashmir and was later accused by Pakistan Government of being a double agent, attempting to gather resources and ammunition to instigate a movement against the state. Upon return from India, he was imprisoned by Pakistan in Haripur District for 10 years.

References

1912 births
1995 deaths
British Indian Army officers
Pakistan Army officers